Elfriede "Elfi" Eder (born 5 January 1970 in Leogang) is a former alpine skier from Austria.

She represented the Caribbean island of Grenada from 1998 to 1999, having previously competed for Austria.

The alpine skier Sylvia Eder is her elder sister.

World Cup victories

References

1970 births
Living people
Sportspeople from Salzburg (state)
Grenadian female alpine skiers
Austrian female alpine skiers
Austrian emigrants to Grenada
Alpine skiers at the 1994 Winter Olympics
Olympic silver medalists for Austria
Olympic alpine skiers of Austria
Olympic medalists in alpine skiing
FIS Alpine Ski World Cup champions
Medalists at the 1994 Winter Olympics
People from Zell am See District
People from Salzburg-Umgebung District